El Vilar is a village in Andorra, located in the parish of Canillo. 

Populated places in Andorra
Canillo